Women began finding work when World War I began in 1914; they had to take the jobs of men who had gone to war. A wide range of jobs needed filling. Automotive machines were in large production around this time to supply the United States and other countries with vehicles for war. This was the start of women playing important roles in the automotive industry.

As at 2016, only 11% of the global workforce in the automotive industry were women, with large national industries such as Japan facing shortages in female engineers.

Notable women linked to the automotive industry

Bertha Benz- A German automotive pioneer. She was the business partner and wife of automobile inventor Karl Benz.  She was known as the first person in history to drive an automobile over a long distance
Mrs. Alice Huyler Ramsey- founded and became president of the first "Women's Motoring Club" in the United States.  On June 9, 1909, this 22-year-old housewife and mother began a 3,800-mile journey from Hell Gate in Manhattan, New York, to San Francisco, California, in a green, four-cylinder, 30-horsepower Maxwell DA.
Florence Lawrence - Actress and car enthusiast born in 1886. Lawrence was the first person to develop for herself what we now call "turn signals". Using flags on either side of the car, she could remotely lift them to signal that she was turning a certain direction. This had never been seen before, and is now such a crucial mechanic that using turn signals is part of the United States' driving laws. Lawrence was also the first to come up with a system to alert drivers behind her that she was slowing down, by holding a sign out of the driver's side window that read "Stop". Although Lawrence never patented this, she is still given credit for playing an important role which has lasted into modern-day automotive design.
Charlotte Bridgwood - Mother of Florence Lawrence and automotive enthusiast. Bridgwood was responsible for developing the windshield wiper in 1917.
Hedy Lamarr- Co-invented an early technique for spread spectrum communications which paved the way for the wireless transmission technology (WiFi) that allows us to enjoy the internet and Bluetooth.
Dr. Gladys West- An African American mathematician who worked for the United States Naval Weapons Laboratory in the 1950s. She completed the computations and processed data to help determine the exact location of satellites. This work was a major contribution to the accuracy of the modern GPS systems we use every day.
Michelle Christensen - Christensen is the first women to lead of a "supercar" design team, working on Honda/Acura's most expensive car, the NSX. No other women had previously had a lead design on an exotic car.
 Mary Barra - The first female CEO of a major global automaker, at General Motors.
Alicia Boler Davis- First African-American women to become a GM manufacturing plant manager. Current, Executive VP of Global Manufacturing at General
Barb Samardzich - COO of Ford Europe.
Pamela Fletcher - VP of Global Electric Vehicle Programs at General Motors.

Women Breaking Ground in the Modern-Day Automotive Industry 

 Amanda Gordon - CEO of GoJo Auto, Denver, CO.  First black woman to own an automotive dealership in the state of Colorado.  Gordon is an advocate for diversity and inclusion in the automotive industry. She has been featured in the Washington Post Watch:  Women who are driven to make the auto industry more inclusive and numerous media outlets and publications, including Come Back TV's Black Business Spotlight, Women of Color Automotive Network's (WOCAN) Speaker Series for trailblazers in the auto industry, TrueCar Industry Insider, and more.

References

History of the automobile
Women in history